Highway 350 (AR 350, Ark. 350, and Hwy. 350) is an east–west state highway in Cross County, Arkansas. The highway begins at an intersection with US Highway 64 (US 64) runs  to Highway 1 at Wilkins. Created in 1966, the highway was extended north to the present terminus at US 64 in 1974. The highway is maintained by the Arkansas Department of Transportation (ArDOT).

Route description
The route begins at an intersection with US 64 west of Wynne in the Arkansas Delta. Although even-numbered routes are signed east–west, Highway 350 runs north-south except for the last . The route is two-lane, undivided, passing through sparsely populated agricultural territory. The highest average daily traffic observed in 2014 was 940 vehicles per day (VPD) on the southern section.

Highway 350 runs due south to an intersection with Highway 284 at the Wynne city limits. The routes form a concurrency south to McElroy, where Highway 284 turns west to Penrose, with Highway 350 continuing due south as a section line road.

History
Highway 350 was created by the Arkansas State Highway Commission between Highway 1 and Highway 284 on November 23, 1966. The highway was extended north to US 64 on February 27, 1974.

Major intersections
Mile markers reset at concurrencies.

See also

References

External links

350
Transportation in Cross County, Arkansas